Ligia Elena is a Venezuelan telenovela written by César Miguel Rondón
and produced by Venevisión in 1982.

Alba Roversi and Guillermo Dávila starred as the main protagonists.

Plot
Ligia Elena is the story of love between a naive young society girl and a musician whose love faces various obstacles. Ligia Elena Irazabal is a beautiful rich girl who meets Ignacio Ramón Nacho Gamboa, an eccentric boy whose father Pancholón works as a driver for the
Irazabal family. Nacho and Ligia Elena meet coincidentally and sparks fly between them at first. Nacho works at a nightclub called El gato enmochilado and one day, he invites Ligia Elena to come and see him play and she goes to the club with her best friend. Ligia Elena has fallen in love with Nacho, but she is engaged to Alfredo, a young lawyer. On her wedding day, Ligia Elena decides to leave Alfredo to be with Nacho, but she discovers that Dolores, the cashier at the night club is Nacho's lover. Feeling sad and confused, she eventually decides to marry Alfredo. Later, Nacho becomes a singing sensation when he is discovered by a music producer, and after becoming famous, he runs away with Ligia Elena to be together.

Cast
 Alba Roversi as Ligia Elena Irazabal
 Guillermo Dávila as Ignacio Ramón Nacho Gamboa
 Diego Acuña
 Reneé de Pallás
 Raúl Xiqués
 Ramón Hinojosa
 Yolanda Méndez
 Julio Jung
 Corina Azopardo
 Esther Orjuela
 Juan Frankis
 Sandra Bruzón
 Estelín Betancort
 Hilda Blanco
 Pedro Durán
 Mariela Alcalá
 Lucila Herrera
 Laura Termini

References

External links
 

1982 telenovelas
Venevisión telenovelas
Venezuelan telenovelas
1982 Venezuelan television series debuts
1983 Venezuelan television series endings
Spanish-language telenovelas
Television shows set in Venezuela